Samantha Bree (Jackson) Runnion (July 26, 1996 – July 15, 2002) was a five-year-old girl abducted from outside her home in Stanton, California, and murdered.

Kidnapping and murder
On July 15, 2002, Runnion was playing with a friend in her front yard when a man approached them asking for help in finding a lost dog. After a short conversation he grabbed Samantha, forced her into his car, and drove away. A day later, her nude body was found fifty miles south in Cleveland National Forest. She had been sexually assaulted and strangled. Police said the killer was "extremely sloppy" and had left behind "mountains of physical evidence connecting him to the crime".

Alejandro Avila of Lake Elsinore, California, was arrested three days after the abduction. His DNA was found on Samantha's body, and her DNA was found in his car. Avila had previously visited his girlfriend in the condominium complex where Samantha lived and had been acquitted of molesting his girlfriend's daughter and niece. Police found child pornography on Avila's laptop computer, and he had booked a motel room on the day of the murder, where it was believed that Samantha was killed. Avila's public defender argued during the trial that he couldn't have kidnapped the girl, abused, murdered, and then dumped her body 50 miles away in one day as the prosecution believed.

On May 16, 2005, a jury returned a guilty verdict, and Avila was sentenced to death. He is incarcerated at San Quentin State Prison on death row. Her mother Erin Runnion launched a foundation called "The Joyful Child Foundation," whose mission is "Preventing crimes against children through programs that educate, empower, and unite families and communities."

See also
List of kidnappings
List of solved missing person cases

References

External links
About.com Crime article on the Runnion case
California Conservatory of the Arts: Kids Next Door is a performance group, in residence at CCA, consisting of students selected by audition from the Conservatory. 2006 is the 25th anniversary of the group.
In memory of Samantha Runnion
Good Morning America story 
Samantha Runnion on Find a Grave
The Joyful Child Foundation

2000s missing person cases
2002 deaths
2002 in California
2002 murders in the United States
Deaths by person in California
Deaths by strangulation in the United States
Female murder victims
Formerly missing people
July 2002 events in the United States
Missing person cases in California
Murder in Riverside County, California
Rapes in the United States
Sexual assaults in the United States
Stanton, California
Incidents of violence against girls